Sebastian Horn (born 1970) is a German musician and television presenter. 

Horn grew up in Bad Tölz  and in 1987 he formed the band Bananafishbones together with Florian Rein and Thomas Dill. Later his brother Peter Horn Jr. replaced Dill in the band. After a few years in which the band mainly played live, their breakthrough came in 1998. Their song "Come to Sin" was used in a commercial for the store C&A.

Links

References

German rock singers
1970 births
German television presenters
21st-century bass guitarists
People from Bad Tölz
Living people